Heart of the Beholder is a 2005 drama film that was written and directed by Ken Tipton. It is based on Tipton's own experience as the owner of a chain of videocassette rental stores in the 1980s. Tipton and his family had opened the first videocassette rental stores in St. Louis in 1980; their business was destroyed by a campaign of Christian fundamentalists who objected to the chain's carrying the film The Last Temptation of Christ for rental.

The film showed at the 2005 Westwood Film Festival. Critic Ryan Cracknell summarized the film, "There's no shortage of material for writer-director Ken Tipton to work with here. That alone makes Heart of the Beholder a film of interest. It is in many ways a politically charged film as it touches on issues of freedom of speech, religious beliefs and all out fanaticism. Still, I didn't think it was charged with enough balance and I think a large part had to do with the film's inconsistent pacing."

The film won the best feature award at the 2005 New Hampshire Film Festival and the directors choice award at the 2005 Bluegrass Independent Film Festival.

References

External links
 
 
 

2005 drama films
2005 films
2000s English-language films
American drama films
2000s American films